Amphorella iridescens is a species of air-breathing land snail, a terrestrial pulmonate gastropod mollusk in the family Ferussaciidae.

This species is endemic to Madeira, Portugal.

References

Ferussaciidae
Taxonomy articles created by Polbot